Olalekan Fatodu is a Nigerian journalist, public relations expert and development practitioner. He is the Senior Special Assistant on Sustainable Development Goals (SDG's) to the Governor of Lagos State, Babajide Sanwo-Olu.

Early life and education 
Fatodu was born and bred in Lagos, a state in the south-western geopolitical zone of Nigeria. He had his primary, secondary and tertiary education in Lagos, where he earned a Bachelor of Science degree in mass communication from the University of Lagos. Shortly afterward, he proceeded to the United Kingdom where he earned a master's degree in diplomatic studies from the University of Westminster. Fatodu is a PRINCE2 certified project management practitioner.

Professional career 
Until his appointment as the Senior Special Assistant on Sustainable Development Goals (SDG's) to the Governor of Lagos State, Babajide Sanwo-Olu, Fatodu served in a dual role as the publisher of Checkout Magazine a business and development-focused publication, and lead consultant at Leeman Communication, a development and strategic communications firm based in Nigeria.

References 

Living people
University of Lagos alumni
People from Lagos
Year of birth missing (living people)
Residents of Lagos